Samuel Costa (born 30 November 1992) is an Italian Nordic combined skier. He was born in Bolzano. He competed at the FIS Nordic World Ski Championships 2011 in Oslo, the FIS Nordic World Ski Championships 2013 in Val di Fiemme, and at the 2014 Winter Olympics in Sochi.

References

External links

1992 births
Living people
Nordic combined skiers at the 2014 Winter Olympics
Nordic combined skiers at the 2022 Winter Olympics
Italian male Nordic combined skiers
Olympic Nordic combined skiers of Italy
Sportspeople from Bolzano
Nordic combined skiers of Fiamme Oro